Chikoy (Sükhe) is a rural locality (a selo) in Kyakhtinsky District, Republic of Buryatia, Russia. The population was 675 as of 2010. There are 15 streets.

Geography 
Chikoy is located 46 km southeast of Kyakhta (the district's administrative centre) by road. Kurort Kiran is the nearest rural locality.

References 

Rural localities in Kyakhtinsky District